The UCI Cyclo-cross World Championships – Women's Under-23 Cyclo-cross is the annual world championship for in the discipline of cyclo-cross for women aged 23 or under, organised by the world governing body, the Union Cycliste Internationale. The event was first run in 2016. The winner has the right to wear the rainbow jersey for a full year when competing in Under-23 cyclo-cross events.

Palmarès

Medal count by country

UCI Cyclo-cross World Championships